(March 26, 1894 – February 12, 1963) was a Rear Admiral in the Imperial Japanese Navy during World War II.

Career 
Naoji Doi was a member of the 43rd Class of the Imperial Japanese Naval Academy, ranking 24 out of 95 Cadets. He commanded the 32nd Naval Special Base Force, a force of naval troops occupying the island of Mindanao during the course of World War II. When Lieutenant-General Gyosaku Morozumi left to command the IJA 35th Army, he left Naoji Doi to command his own force by himself. When the United States Marines landed on Mindanao, they were aided by the regular and constable troops of the Philippine Commonwealth Army and Philippine Constabulary and pushed the Japanese back to the northern end of the island. Naoji Doi and his troops fought until the end of the war on August 15.

Assignments 
Crewmember, Iwate – 16 December 1915 – 22 August 1916
Division Officer, Ise – 1 December 1921 – 1 December 1922
Division Officer, Izumo – 1 December 1927 – 15 January 1928
Equipping Officer, Nachi – 15 July 1928 – 10 September 1928
Torpedo Officer, Nachi – 10 September 1928 – 1 December 1931
Executive Officer, Sasebo Sailor Corps – 5 December 1938 – 15 October 1941
Executive Officer, Amoy Area Special Base Force – 15 October 1941 – 15 January 1942
Commanding Officer, 15th Guard Unit – 1 February 1942 – 20 August 1942
Chief of Administration & Worker Training Bureaus, Toyokawa Navy Yard – 12 September 1942 – 5 May 1944
Commanding Officer, Rashin Area Special Base Force – 25 June 1944 – 20 September 1944
Commanding Officer, 32nd Special Base Force – 6 October 1944 – 15 August 1945

Promotions 
Midshipman – 16 December 1915
Ensign – 1 December 1916
Sub-Lieutenant – 1 December 1918
Lieutenant – 1 December 1921
Lieutenant Commander – 1 December 1927
Commander – 15 November 1933
Captain – 15 November 1938
Rear Admiral – 1 May 1944

References 

Japanese admirals of World War II
Imperial Japanese Navy admirals
1894 births
1996 deaths